Pukar  (transl. Call) is a 1983 Indian Hindi-language action film, directed by Ramesh Behl, starring Amitabh Bachchan, Randhir Kapoor, Zeenat Aman and Tina Munim. It is a film about freedom fighters trying to liberate Goa from the Portuguese.

Scenes of the film were shot in Daman and Diu.

Cast 

 Amitabh Bachchan as Ramdas/Ronnie
 Randhir Kapoor as Shekar Nagare	
 Zeenat Aman as Julie	
 Tina Munim as Usha
 Prem Chopra as Montero
 Sudhir Dalvi as Dinanath, Ramdas Father
 Shriram Lagoo as Purandare
 P. Jairaj as Narvekar
 Om Shivpuri as Dayanand, Father of Shekhar Nagare
 Chand Usmani as Saraswati, Mother of Shekhar Nagare
 Pinchoo Kapoor as Mr Kamat, father of Usha
 Sudha Chopra as Mrs Kamat, mother of Usha
 Sujit Kumar as Hasmukh
 Satyendra Kapoor as Gopal
 Viju Khote as Kiran Bhandare
 Shubha Khote as Young Julie's Mother
 Narendra Nath as Jaggu
 Sharat Saxena as Pablo
 Radha Bartake as Anjali, Gopal Daughter
 Shiva Rindani
 Gurbachan Singh as Godfre
 Gautam Sarin as Portuguese police Officer
 Azaad Irani as Latif

Soundtrack
Music Direction: R. D. Burman, Lyrics: Gulshan Bawra, Audio: Polydor now Universal Music Group

The music for all the songs were composed by Rahul Dev Burman and penned by Gulshan Bawra.

References

External links
 

1983 films
1980s Hindi-language films
Films directed by Ramesh Behl
Films scored by R. D. Burman
Films set in Goa
Films shot in Daman and Diu
Goa liberation movement
Rose Audio Visuals